Beyhan Sultan ("Leader of the Khan"; 13 January 1766 – 7 November 1824) was an Ottoman princess, the daughter of Sultan Mustafa III and his consort Adilşah Kadın. She was the half sister of Sultan Selim III.

Early life
Beyhan Sultan was born on 13 January 1766 in the Topkapı Palace. Her father was Sultan Mustafa III, and her mother was Adilşah Kadın. She had a full sister named Hatice Sultan, two years younger than her. The sisters remained very attached throughout their life. After her father's death in 1774, when she was nine years old, she followed her mother and sister to the Old Palace. Due to the isolated environment, both Beyhan and her sister developed symptoms of depression, anxiety, and other troubling behaviors. In particular, Beyhan fainted frequently and had hysterical episodes of screaming and crying. Her mother, Adilşah Kadın, then wrote to the new sultan, Abdülhamid I, half-brother of Mustafa III, to allow her daughters to marry, which would allow them to leave confinement in the Palace. The sultan granted her request and found husbands for the two princesses.

Marriage
When Beyhan was eighteen, her mother wrote a letter to Sultan Abdul Hamid I requesting him to get her daughters. In 1784, her uncle Sultan Abdul Hamid I arranged her marriage to Silahdar Mustafa Pasha, the governor of Aleppo. The marriage took place on 22 April 1784, after the pasha's return to Istanbul. On 5 May, her trousseau, and the next day, Beyhan Sultan herself were transported from the Topkapı Palace to her palace at Cağaloğlu. She was nineteen years old.

The two together had a daughter named Hatice Hanımsultan, born in 1785, she was married in 1799. Beyhan was widowed at her husband's death in March 1799, and like most of the princesses of her generation she didn't remarried. Her brother Selim used to visit her every Wednesday and they went to numerous concerts together. Although her sister Hatice Sultan became the most famous and influential princess of their generation, Beyhan was also active in supporting Selim's reforms and innovation and sharing her interest in Europe, especially art, architecture and design and fashion. She even organized parties for the wives of foreign ambassadors.  

Beyhan had educated the future imperial consort Hoşyar Kadın, who was to become the wife of her cousin Sultan Mahmud II and the mother of Mihrimah Sultan and Zeynep Sultan.

Lands and endowments
Beyhan was a rich woman and received many mukata'as from her brother Selim III and her uncle Abdul Hamid. She was a wealthy princess, owned two palaces on the Bosphorus (Beşiktaş, Arnavutköy). She was also given the Old Çırağan Palace, one of the sites of the Lale Devri (Tulip period) entertainments, and Beyhan demolished the it with the approval of Selim III and began construction of a European-style palace in 1791. The new palace was ready in 1795, just when his sister Hatice was busy building her seaside palace with the help of Melling, a European designer. She built twin palaces in Yeşillioğlu, giving the other to her sister Hatice. She received malikanes in the district of Andrusa, Kalamata, Fanar, Karitena and Londar on 1802. In 1796, she appointed Numan ağa, the voyvoda of these districts, to act as her agent (kethüda) to collect the cizye and 'avariz dues from her çiftliks. In 1802, she appointed Al-Hac Hasan ağa as her kethüda when Hüseyn ağa, a former voyvoda, was too oppressive. She also appears to have received the malikane of the island of Andros and Syros in 1789.

In 1801, she had a fountain built in her name in the Kuruçeşme neighbourhood of Istanbul. In 1804, she built another fountain in her name on the banks of Akıntıburnu. In 1817, she repaired the Mesih Pasha Fountain located in the Hırka-i Şerif. She also built two fountains near her palaces during the reign of brother Selim. Beyhan Sultan built a school in the vicinity of Yeşilioğlu Palace, opposite of Hatice Sultan Palace in the memory of her mother.  

The Beyhan Sultan Fountain, which is one of the most beautiful works of the Ottoman art of its kind in the Turkish era, was completely dismantled, but it has not been revived until today, in case of street expansion. Although the Beyhan Sultan Fountain was created entirely under the influence of Western art, it was a monument that marked the location of a beach adorned this coast, apart from being a work that added beauty to the Bosphorus.

Patroness of arts
Beyhan, her brother Selim, and her sister Hatice Sultan had a considerable enthusiasm for European arts. Both Beyhan, and Selim admired Mevlevi Sheikh Galib, probably a major poet of the age, and were his patrons. She also had copies made of his poems.

Death
Beyhan Sultan died on 7 November 1824, at the age of fifty eight, and was buried in the mausoleum of Mihrişah Sultan located in Eyüp.

Issue
By her husband, Beyhan Sultan had a daughter:
 Hatice Hanımsultan (1785 - After 1799). Called after Beyhan's sister, Hatice Sultan. She married in 1799.

See also
 List of Ottoman princesses

Ancestry

References

Sources

 

1765 births
1824 deaths
18th-century Ottoman princesses
19th-century Ottoman princesses